The Butkus Award, instituted in 1985 by the Downtown Athletic Club of Orlando, is given annually to the top linebackers at the high school, collegiate and professional levels of football. The award, named in honor of College Football Hall of Fame and Pro Football Hall of Fame linebacker Dick Butkus, is presented by the Butkus Foundation, a non-profit organization that supports a number of health and wellness activities including the "I Play Clean" anti-steroid program. The award was first established by the Downtown Athletic Club of Orlando, which relinquished control of the award in 2008 following a lawsuit by Butkus.

Traditionally, the award was given only to the top collegiate linebacker. The Butkus Award was expanded in 2008 to include high school and professional winners as part of a makeover by the Butkus family to help end anabolic steroid abuse among young athletes. Three players have won both the high school and collegiate Butkus Awards: Notre Dame linebackers Manti Te'o (2008, 2012) and Jaylon Smith (2012, 2015) and also Georgia linebacker Nakobe Dean (2018, 2021). Four players have won both the collegiate and professional Butkus Awards: San Francisco 49ers linebacker Patrick Willis (2006, 2009), Denver Broncos linebacker Von Miller (2010, 2012), Carolina Panthers linebacker Luke Kuechly (2011, 2014, 2015, 2017), and Baltimore Ravens linebacker Roquan Smith (2017, 2022)

Recipients

Collegiate winners

Professional winners

High school winners

References

External links
 

National Football League trophies and awards
College football national player awards
High school football trophies and awards in the United States
Awards established in 1985
1985 establishments in Florida